Isia Basset  (born 20 September 1993) is a French orienteering competitor. She was born in Lyon. She won a bronze medal in the middle distance at the 2018 World Orienteering Championships in Latvia, behind Natalia Gemperle and Marika Teini. This was Basset's first international championships medal in her career, and her 2018 result was the first French medal in women's classes in the history of World Orienteering Championships.

Basset competed at the 2015, 2016 and 2017 World Orienteering Championships, and at the 2014, 2016 and 2018 European Orienteering Championships.

References

External links

French orienteers
Female orienteers
Foot orienteers
1993 births
Living people
Sportspeople from Lyon
World Orienteering Championships medalists
Competitors at the 2017 World Games
21st-century French women